Zargyar may refer to:
Araz Zargyar, Azerbaijan
Zərgər, Azerbaijan